The fields of marketing and artificial intelligence converge in systems which assist in areas such as market forecasting, and automation of processes and decision making, along with increased efficiency of tasks which would usually be performed by humans. The science behind these systems can be explained through neural networks and expert systems, computer programs that process input and provide valuable output for marketers.

Artificial intelligence systems stemming from social computing technology can be applied to understand social networks on the Web. Data mining techniques can be used to analyze different types of social networks. This analysis helps a marketer to identify influential actors or nodes within networks, information which can then be applied to take a societal marketing approach.

Artificial neural networks

An artificial neural network is a form of computer program modeled on the brain and nervous system of humans. Neural networks are composed of a series of interconnected processing neurons functioning in unison to achieve certain outcomes. 
Using “human-like trial and error learning methods neural networks detect patterns existing within a data set ignoring data that is not significant while emphasizing the data which is most influential”.

From a marketing perspective, neural networks are a form of the software tool used to assist in decision making. Neural networks are effective in gathering and extracting information from large data sources and have the ability to identify the cause and effect within data. These neural nets through the process of learning, identify relationships and connections between databases. Once knowledge has been accumulated, neural networks can be relied on to provide generalizations and can apply past knowledge and learning to a variety of situations.

Neural networks help fulfill the role of marketing companies through effectively aiding in market segmentation and measurement of performance while reducing costs and improving accuracy. Due to their learning ability, flexibility, adaption, and knowledge discovery, neural networks offer many advantages over traditional models. Neural networks can be used to assist in pattern classification, forecasting and marketing analysis.

Pattern classification

Classification of customers can be facilitated through the neural network approach allowing companies to make informed marketing decisions. An example of this was employed by Spiegel Inc., a firm dealing in direct-mail operations that used neural networks to improve efficiencies. Using software developed by NeuralWare Inc., Spiegel identified the demographics of customers who had made a single purchase and those customers who had made repeat purchases. Neural networks where then able to identify the key patterns and consequently identify the customers that were most likely to repeat purchase. Understanding this information allowed Spiegel to streamline marketing efforts, and reduced costs.

Forecasting

Sales forecasting “is the process of estimating future events with the goal of providing benchmarks for monitoring actual performance and reducing uncertainty". Artificial intelligence techniques have emerged to facilitate the process of forecasting through increasing accuracy in the areas of demand for products, distribution, employee turnover, performance measurement, and inventory control. An example of forecasting using neural networks is the Airline Marketing Assistant/Tactician; an application developed by BehabHeuristics which allows for the forecasting of passenger demand and consequent seat allocation through neural networks. This system has been used by National air Canada and USAir.

Marketing analysis

Neural networks provide a useful alternative to traditional statistical models due to their reliability, time-saving characteristics and ability to recognize patterns from incomplete or noisy data. Examples of marketing analysis systems includes the Target Marketing System developed by Churchull Systems for Veratex Corporation. This support system scans a market database to identify dormant customers allowing management to make decisions regarding which key customers to target.

When performing marketing analysis, neural networks can assist in the gathering and processing of information ranging from consumer demographics and credit history to the purchase patterns of consumers.

AI is allowing organizations to “deliver an ad experience that is more personalized for each user, shapes the customer journey, influences purchasing decisions, and builds brand loyalty” (“How”). AI technology allows marketers to separate their consumers into distinct personas and understand what motivates their consumers. Here they can then focus on the specific needs of their audience and create a long-lasting relationship with the brand (Kushmaro). Ultimately brands want to create that loyalty with a consumer, and AI will allow them to better achieve this. “Pini Yakuel, founder and CEO of Optimove. “By analyzing customers based on their movement among segments over time, we can achieve dynamic micro-segmentation and predict future behavior in a very accurate fashion’” (Kushmaro). Being able to predict future behaviors of consumers is very important. This way marketers can specifically market to consumers based on their current behaviors and the predictions of their future behaviors. This will allow for a loyal relationship between the consumer and the brand and will ultimately help businesses.

Application of artificial intelligence to marketing decision making

Marketing is a complex field of decision making which involves a large degree of both judgment and intuition on behalf of the marketer. The enormous increase in complexity that the individual decision-maker faces renders the decision-making process almost an impossible task. The marketing decision engine can help distill the noise. The generation of more efficient management procedures have been recognized as a necessity. The application of Artificial intelligence to decision making through a Decision Support System has the ability to aid the decision-maker in dealing with uncertainty in decision problems.  Artificial intelligence techniques are increasingly extending decision support through analyzing trends; providing forecasts; reducing information overload; enabling communication required for collaborative decisions, and allowing for up-to-date information.

The structure of marketing decisions

Organizations strive to satisfy the needs of the customers, paying specific attention to their desires. A consumer-orientated approach requires the production of goods and services that align with these needs. Understanding consumer behavior aids the marketer in making appropriate decisions. Thus, decision making is dependent on the marketing problem, the decision-maker, and the decision environment.

Expert system

An expert system is a software program that combines the knowledge of experts in an attempt to solve problems through emulating the knowledge and reasoning procedures of the experts. Each expert system has the ability to process data, and then through reasoning, transform it into evaluations, judgments, and opinions, thus providing advises to specialized problems.

The use of an expert system that applies to the field of marketing is MARKEX (Market Expert). These Intelligent decision support systems act as consultants for marketers, supporting the decision-maker in different stages, specifically in the new product development process. The software provides a systematic analysis that uses various methods of forecasting, data analysis and multi-criteria decision making to select the most appropriate penetration strategy. BRANDFRAME is another example of a system developed to assist marketers in the decision-making process. The system supports a brand manager in terms of identifying the brand's attributes, retail channels, competing brands, targets, and budgets.  New marketing input is fed into the system where BRANDFRAME analyses the data. Recommendations are made by the system in regard to marketing mix instruments, such as lowering the price or starting a sales promotional campaign.

Artificial intelligence and automation efficiency

Application to marketing automation

In terms of marketing, automation uses software to computerize marketing processes that would have otherwise been performed manually. It assists in effectively allowing processes such as customer segmentation, campaign management, and product promotion, to be undertaken at a more efficient rate. Marketing automation is a key component of Customer Relationship Management (CRM). Companies are using systems that employ data-mining algorithms that analyze the customer database, giving further insight into the customer. This information may refer to socio-economic characteristics, earlier interactions with the customer, and information about the purchase history of the customer. Various systems have been designed to give organizations control over their data. Automation tools allow the system to monitor the performance of campaigns, making regular adjustments to the campaigns to improve response rates and to provide campaign performance tracking.

Automation of distribution

Distribution of products requires companies to access accurate data so they are able to respond to fluctuating trends in product demand. Automation processes are able to provide a comprehensive system that improves real-time monitoring and intelligent control. 
Amazon acquired Kiva Systems, the makers of the warehouse robot for $775 million in 2012. Prior to the purchase of the automated system, human employees would have to walk the enormous warehouse, tracking and retrieving books. The Kiva robots are able to undertake order fulfillment, product replenishment, as well as heavy lifting, thus increasing efficiency for the company.

Use of artificial intelligence to analyze social networks on the web

A social network is a social arrangement of actors who make up a group, within a network; there can be an array of ties and nodes that exemplifies common occurrences within a network and common relationships. Lui (2011), describes a social network as, “the study of social entities (people in an organization, called actors), and their interactions and relationships. The interactions and relationships can be represented with a network or graph, where each vertex (or node) represents an actor and each link represents a relationship.” At the present time there is a growth in virtual social networking with the common emergence of social networks being replicated online, for example, social networking sites such as Twitter, Facebook and LinkedIn. From a marketing perspective, analysis and simulation of these networks can help to understand consumer behavior and opinion. The use of Agent-based social simulation techniques and data/opinion mining to collect social knowledge of networks can help a marketer to understand their market and segments within it.

Social computing

Social computing is the branch of technology that can be used by marketers to analyze social behaviors within networks and also allows for the creation of artificial social agents. Social computing provides the platform to create social-based software; some earlier examples of social computing are such systems that allow a user to extract social information such as contact information from email accounts e.g. addresses and companies titles from one's email using Conditional Random Field (CRFs) technology.

Data mining

Data mining involves searching the Web for existing information namely opinions and feelings that are posted online among social networks. “ This area of study is called opinion mining or sentiment analysis. It analyzes peoples opinions, appraisals, attitudes, and emotions toward entities, individuals, issues, events, topics, and their attributes”. However searching for this information and analysis of it can be a sizeable task, manually analyzing this information also presents the potential for researcher bias. Therefore, objective opinion analysis systems are suggested as a solution to this in the form of automated opinion mining and summarization systems. Marketers using this type of intelligence to make inferences about consumer opinion should be wary of what is called opinion spam, where fake opinions or reviews are posted in the web in order to influence potential consumers for or against a product or service.

Search engines are a common type of intelligence that seeks to learn what the user is interested in to present appropriate information. PageRank and HITS are examples of algorithms that search for information via hyperlinks; Google uses PageRank to control its search engine. Hyperlink based intelligence can be used to seek out web communities,  which is described as ‘ a cluster of densely linked pages representing a group of people with a common interest’.

Centrality and prestige are types of measurement terms used to describe the level of common occurrences among a group of actors; the terms help to describe the level of influence and actor holds within a social network. Someone who has many ties within a network would be described as a ‘central’ or ‘prestige’ actor. Identifying these nodes within a social network is helpful for marketers to find out who are the trendsetters within social networks.

Social Media AI-based tools

Ellott (2017) looked at the AI-based tools that are transforming social media markets. There are six areas of the social media marketing that are being impacted by AI: content creation, consumer intelligence, customer service, influencer marketing, content optimization, and competitive intelligence. One tool, Twizoo, uses AI to gather reviews from social networking sites about restaurants to help users find a place to eat. Twizoo had much success from the feedback of its users and expanded by launching “a widget where travel and hospitality websites could instantly bring those social media reviews to their own audiences” (Twizzo, 2017).

Influencer marketing is huge on social media. Many brands collaborate and sponsor popular social media users and try to promote their products to that social media user's followers. This has been a successful tactic for Sugar Bear Hair and subscription box company FabFitFun. One company, InsightPool, uses AI to search through over 600 million influencers on social media to find the influencers who fit the brand's personality and target audience (Ellot, 2017). This can be an effective tool when searching for new influencers or a specific audience. It could also be cost-effective to find someone who is not famous (like Kardashians/Bachelorette cast) but could also influence a large audience and bring in sales

See also 
 Marketing intelligence
 Media intelligence
 Customer Data Platform
 Market and Competitive Intelligence

References

Marketing
Applications of artificial intelligence
Mass media monitoring